Edgar Livingston Kennedy (April 26, 1890 – November 9, 1948) was an American comedic character actor who appeared in at least 500 films during the silent and sound eras. Professionally, he was known as "Slow Burn", owing to his ability to portray characters whose anger slowly rose in frustrating situations. 

In many of his roles, he used exasperated facial expressions and performed very deliberately to convey his rising anger or "burn", often rubbing his hand over his bald head and across his face in an effort to control his temper. One memorable example of his comedy technique can be seen in the 1933 Marx Brothers' film Duck Soup, where he plays a sidewalk lemonade vendor who is harassed and increasingly provoked by Harpo and Chico.

Early years
Kennedy was born April 26, 1890, in Monterey County, California, to Canadians Neil Kennedy and Annie Quinn. He attended San Rafael High School before taking up boxing. He was a light-heavyweight and once went 14 rounds with Jack Dempsey. After boxing, he worked as a singer in vaudeville, musical comedy and light opera.

Film career
After making his debut in 1911, Kennedy performed with some of Hollywood's biggest comedians, including Roscoe Arbuckle, Charlie Chaplin, Laurel and Hardy, the Marx Brothers, W.C. Fields, Charley Chase and Our Gang. He was also one of the original Keystone Kops.

Kennedy's burly frame originally suited him for villainous or threatening roles in silent pictures. By the 1920s, he was working for producer Hal Roach, who kept him busy playing supporting roles in short comedies. He starred in one short, A Pair of Tights (1928), where he plays a tightwad determined to spend as little as possible on a date. His antics with comedian Stuart Erwin are reminiscent of Roach's Laurel and Hardy comedies, produced concurrently. Kennedy also directed half a dozen of Roach's two-reel comedies.

In 1930, RKO-Pathe featured Kennedy in a pair of short-subject comedies, Next Door Neighbors and Help Wanted, Female. His characterization of a short-tempered householder was so effective, RKO built a series around him. The "Average Man" comedies starred Kennedy as a blustery, stubborn everyman determined to accomplish a household project or get ahead professionally, despite the meddling of his featherbrained wife (usually Florence Lake), her freeloading brother (originally William Eugene, then Jack Rice) and his dubious mother-in-law (Dot Farley). Kennedy pioneered the kind of domestic situation comedy that later became familiar on television. Each installment ended with Kennedy embarrassed, humbled or defeated, looking at the camera and doing his patent slow burn. The Edgar Kennedy Series, with its theme song "Chopsticks", became a standard part of the moviegoing experience. He made six "Average Man" shorts a year for 17 years. In 1938, he worked as a straight man for British comedian Will Hay in Hey! Hey! USA.

Kennedy became so identified with frustration that practically every studio hired him to play hotheads. He often played dumb cops, detectives, and even a prison warden; sometimes he was a grouchy moving man, truck driver, or blue-collar workman. His character usually lost his temper at least once. In Diplomaniacs, he presides over an international tribunal where Wheeler & Woolsey want to do something about world peace. "Well, ya can't do anything about it ," yells Kennedy, "This is a " Kennedy, established as the poster boy for frustration, even starred in an instructional film titled The Other Fellow, where he played a loudmouthed roadhog venting his anger on other drivers (each played by Kennedy as well), little realizing that, to them,  is "the other fellow."

Perhaps his most unusual roles were as a puppeteer in the detective mystery The Falcon Strikes Back, and as a philosophical bartender inspired to create exotic cocktails in Harold Lloyd's last film, The Sin of Harold Diddlebock (1947). He also played comical detectives opposite two titans of acting: John Barrymore, in Twentieth Century (1934); and Rex Harrison, in Unfaithfully Yours (1948). In the latter, he tells Harrison's character, a symphony conductor, "Nobody handles Handel like you handle Handel."

Death
Kennedy died of throat cancer at the Motion Picture Hospital, San Fernando Valley on November 9, 1948. Tom Kennedy (no relation) and Charles Coburn spoke at the funeral service held at St. Gregory's Church, with Chester Conklin, Jimmy Finlayson, Del Lord and Billy Gilbert among the mourners. Kennedy was interred at the Holy Cross Cemetery, Culver City, Los Angeles County, California.

Selected filmography
As actor:

 Brown of Harvard (1911, Short) as Claxton Madden
 Hoffmeyer's Legacy (1912, Short) as Keystone Kop (uncredited)
 The Bangville Police (1913, Short) as 3rd Deputy (in straw hat)
 The Star Boarder (1914, Short) as Landlady's Husband
 The Knockout (1914, Short) as Cyclone Flynn (uncredited)
 Tillie's Punctured Romance (1914) as Restaurant Owner / Butler (uncredited)
 The Stolen Triumph (1916) as Edwin Rowley, Jr.
 His Bitter Bill (1916) as Diamond Dan
The Blue Streak (1917)
 Watch Your Neighbor (1918)
 Mickey (1918) as Stage Driver / Bookie (uncredited)
 Yankee Doodle in Berlin (1919) as German Prison Guard (uncredited)
 Daredevil Jack (1920)
 Puppets of Fate (1921) as Mike Reynolds
 Skirts (1921)
 The Leather Pushers (1922) as Ptomaine Tommy
 Bell Boy 13 (1923) as Chef (uncredited)
 The Little Girl Next Door (1923) as Hank Hall
 The Night Message (1924) as Lem Beeman
 Racing for Life (1924) as Tom Grady
 Paths to Paradise (1925) as Detective (uncredited)
 The Trouble with Wives (1925) as Detective
 The Golden Princess (1925) as Gewilliker Hay
 The People vs. Nancy Preston (1925) as Gloomy Gus
 His People (1925) as Thomas Nolan
 Oh What a Nurse! (1926) as Eric Johnson
 My Old Dutch (1926) as Bill Sproat
 Across the Pacific (1926) as Cpl. Ryan
 The Better 'Ole (1926) as Cpl. Austin
 Going Crooked (1926) as Detective
 Finger Prints (1927) as O.K. McDuff
 The Gay Old Bird (1927) as Chauffeur
 The Wrong Mr. Wright (1927) as Trayguard
 Wedding Bills (1927) as Detective
 The Chinese Parrot (1927) as Maydorf
 Leave 'Em Laughing (1928, Short) (First appearance with Laurel and Hardy)
 The Finishing Touch (1928, Short) as Policeman (credited as Ed Kennedy)
 Two Tars (1928, Short) as Motorist
 Trent's Last Case (1929) as Inspector Murch
 Unaccustomed As We Are (1929) as Mr. Kennedy
 Perfect Day (1929, Short) as Uncle Edgar
 They Had to See Paris (1929) as Ed Eggers (uncredited)
 Welcome Danger (1929) as SFPD Desk Sergeant (uncredited)
 Night Owls (1930, Short) as Officer Kennedy
 Quick Millions (1931) as Cop (uncredited)
 Bad Company (1931) as Buffington – Doorman
 The Carnival Boat (1932) as Baldy
 Westward Passage (1932) as Elmer
 Hold 'Em Jail (1932) as Warden Elmer Jones
 Little Orphan Annie (1932) as Daddy Warbucks
 Rockabye (1932) as Water Wagon-Driver (uncredited)
 The Penguin Pool murder (1932) as Donovan
 Scarlet River (1933) as Sam Gilroy
 Diplomaniacs (1933) as chairman – Peace Conference
 Son of the Border (1933) as Windy
 Cross Fire (1933) as Ed Wimpy
 Professional Sweetheart (1933) as Tim Kelsey
 Good Housewrecking (1933, Short) as Mr. Kennedy
 Tillie and Gus (1933) as Judge
 Duck Soup (1933) as Lemonade Vendor
 King for a Night (1933) as Cop (uncredited)
 All of Me (1934) as Guard (uncredited)
 Heat Lightning (1934) as Herbert – the Husband
 Twentieth Century (1934) as McGonigle
 Operator 13 (1934) as Confederate Officer Jealous of Artilleryman (uncredited)
 Murder on the Blackboard (1934) as Detective Donahue
 Money Means Nothing (1934) as Herbert Green
 We're Rich Again (1934) as Healy, Process Server
 Bachelor Bait (1934) (scenes deleted)
 King Kelly of the U.S.A. (1934) as Happy Moran
 Gridiron Flash (1934) as Officer Thurston
 Kid Millions (1934) as Herman Wilson
 The Marines Are Coming (1934) as Sgt. Buck Martin
 Flirting with Danger (1934) as Jimmie Pierson
 The Silver Streak (1934) as Dan O'Brien
 Affairs of a Gentleman (1934)
 Rendezvous at Midnight (1935) as Mahoney
 Living on Velvet (1935) as Counterman
 The Cowboy Millionaire (1935) as Willy Persimmon Bates
 Woman Wanted (1935) as Sweeney
 Little Big Shot (1935) as Onderdonk
 1,000 Dollars a Minute (1935) as Police Officer McCarthy
 In Person (1935) as Man (uncredited)
 The Bride Comes Home (1935) as Henry
 It's Up to You (1936) as Elmer Block
 The Return of Jimmy Valentine (1936) as Callahan
 Will Power (1936, Short) as Himself
 The Robin Hood of El Dorado (1936) as Sheriff Judd
 Small Town Girl (1936) as Captain Mack
 Fatal Lady (1936) as Rudolf Hochstetter
 San Francisco (1936) as Sheriff
 Yours for the Asking (1936) as Bicarbonate
 Mad Holiday (1936) as Donovan
 Three Men on a Horse (1936) as Harry
 When's Your Birthday? (1937) as Mr. Basscombe
 The Other Fellow (1937, Short) as Various Roles
 A Star Is Born (1937) as Pop Randall
 Super-Sleuth (1937) as Police Lt. Garrison
 Double Wedding (1937) as Spike
 Hollywood Hotel (1937) as Callaghan
 True Confession (1937) as Darsey
 The Black Doll (1938) as Sheriff Renick
 Scandal Sheet (1938) as Daniel Webster Smith
 Peck's Bad Boy with the Circus (1938) as Arthur Bailey
 Hey! Hey! USA (1938) as Bugs Leary
 It's a Wonderful World (1939) as Police Lieutenant Miller
 Everything's on Ice (1939) as Joe Barton
 Little Accident (1939) as Paper Hanger
 Laugh it Off (1939) as Judge John J. McGuinnis
 Charlie McCarthy, Detective (1939) as Inspector Dailey
 Sandy Is a Lady (1940) as Officer Rafferty
 Dr. Christian Meets the Women (1940) as George Browning
 The Bride Wore Crutches (1940) as Police Captain McGuire
 Margie (1940) as Chauncey
 The Quarterback (1940) as Pops
 Who Killed Aunt Maggie? (1940) as Sheriff Gregory
 Sandy Gets Her Man (1940) as Fire Chief Galvin
 Li'l Abner (1940) as Cornelius Cornpone
 Remedy for Riches (1940) as George Browning
 Too Many Blondes (1941) as Hotel Manager (uncredited)
 Blondie in Society (1941) as Doctor
 Public Enemies (1941) as Biff
 Private Snuffy Smith (1942) as Sergeant Ed Cooper
 Pardon My Stripes (1942) as Warden Bingham
 In Old California (1942) as Kegs McKeever
 There's One Born Every Minute (1942) as Mayor Moe Carson
 Hillbilly Blitzkrieg (1942) as Sgt. Homer Gatling
 The Crime Smasher (1943) as Police Chief Murphy
 Hold Your Temper (1943, Short) as Himself
 The Falcon Strikes Back (1943) as Smiley Dugan
 Air Raid Wardens (1943) as Joe Bledsoe
 Hitler's Madman (1943) as Nepomuk – the Hermit
 The Girl from Monterrey (1943) as Doc Hogan, Fight Promoter
 Crazy House (1943) as Judge
 It Happened Tomorrow (1944) as Inspector Mulrooney
 Radio Rampage (1944, Short) as Himself
 The Great Alaskan Mystery (1944, Serial) as Bosun Higgins
 Anchors Aweigh (1945) as Police Captain
 Captain Tugboat Annie (1945) as Captain Bullwinkle
 It's Your Move (1945, Short) as Himself 
 You Drive Me Crazy (1945, Short) as Himself
 The Sin of Harold Diddlebock (1947) (a.k.a. Mad Wednesday) as Jake the Bartender
 Television Turmoil (1947, Short) as Himself
 Heaven Only Knows (1947) as Judd
 Unfaithfully Yours (1948) as Detective Sweeney
 My Dream Is Yours (1949) as Uncle Charlie (final film role)

As director:
 From Soup to Nuts (1928) — Laurel and Hardy two-reeler (silent)
 You're Darn Tootin' (1928) — Laurel and Hardy two-reeler (silent)

References

External links

 Edgar Kennedy at The Way Out West Tent, The Sons of the Desert

1890 births
1948 deaths
20th-century American comedians
20th-century American male actors
American male boxers
American male comedians
American male comedy actors
American male film actors
American male silent film actors
American people of Canadian descent
Hal Roach Studios short film series
Boxers from California
Burials at Holy Cross Cemetery, Culver City
Comedians from California
Deaths from cancer in California
Deaths from esophageal cancer
Hal Roach Studios actors
Light-heavyweight boxers
Male actors from California
People from Monterey County, California
Silent film comedians